Jim Kekeris (1923–1997) was a player in the National Football League.

Biography
Kekeris was born on October 17, 1923 in St. Louis, Missouri.

Career
Kekeris was drafted in the third round of the 1947 NFL Draft by the Detroit Lions and would play that season with the Philadelphia Eagles. The following season, he played with the Green Bay Packers.

He played at the collegiate level at the University of Missouri and is an inductee in the University's Intercollegiate Athletics Hall of Fame.

See also
List of Philadelphia Eagles players
List of Green Bay Packers players

References

External links
  

1923 births
1997 deaths
Players of American football from St. Louis
Philadelphia Eagles players
Green Bay Packers players
Missouri Tigers football players